Peggy Thompson is a Canadian screenwriter, producer, playwright, and professor. She is known for her films The Lotus Eaters and Better Than Chocolate.

Career 
Thompson's 1989 short film In Search of the Last Good Man won the Genie Award for Best Live Action Short Drama at the 11th Genie Awards in 1990. She won the award for Best Screenplay at the 14th Genie Awards in 1993 for The Lotus Eaters.

Thompson wrote the screenplay and co-produced the 2000 film, Better Than Chocolate. She began conceiving the film in 1993, shortly after finishing The Lotus Eaters, while on a retreat with Better Than Chocolate's other producer, Sharon McGowan.The two dared each other to create a lesbian coming out comedy. Thompson was committed to not having Better Than Chocolate be in "the tradition of the celluloid closet" and thus gave the lesbian characters in the film a happy ending.

Her other credits include the films Saint Monica and Bearded Ladies: The Photography of Rosamond Norbury, the television series The Beachcombers, Da Vinci's Inquest and Big Sound, and stage plays including Brides in Space and The Last Will and Testament of Lolita. She was also coauthor, with Saeko Usukawa, of two coffee table books on film history, Hard Boiled: Great Lines from Film Noir and Tall in the Saddle: Great Lines from Classic Westerns.

Thompson is currently an associate professor of screenwriting at the University of British Columbia.

Personal life 
Saeko Usukawa, an art book writer and editor with Douglas & McIntyre, was Thompson's partner from 1978 until her death in 2009.

References

External links

Canadian women screenwriters
Canadian television writers
Film producers from British Columbia
Academic staff of the University of British Columbia
Canadian LGBT screenwriters
LGBT producers
Canadian lesbian writers
Living people
Best Screenplay Genie and Canadian Screen Award winners
20th-century Canadian dramatists and playwrights
Canadian women dramatists and playwrights
Canadian LGBT dramatists and playwrights
20th-century Canadian women writers
Canadian women film producers
Canadian women television writers
1952 births
Lesbian screenwriters
Lesbian dramatists and playwrights
20th-century Canadian LGBT people